Klaus Klaffenböck (born 24 July 1968 in Peuerbach, Austria) is an Austrian World Champion in the FIM World Sidecar Championship, and former team-principal of Klaffi Honda World Superbike squad running Alex Barros, Frankie Chili and Max Neukirchner.

After winning the 2001 World Sidecar Championship with passenger Christian Parzer with a LCR Suzuki sidecar, Klaffenböck now competes at the Isle of Man TT Races. After winning the 2010 Sidecar TT Race 'A' he became the first Austrian winner of an Isle of Man TT race since Rupert Hollaus in the 1954 Ultra-Lightweight TT.

References

External links
IOM TT Database Competitor Profile

1968 births
Austrian motorcycle racers
Isle of Man TT riders
Living people
Sidecar racers
People from Grieskirchen District
Sportspeople from Upper Austria